Jánošík can refer to:

 Jánošík, a village in Serbia with Slovak ethnic majority
 Juraj Jánošík, a famous Slovak outlaw
 Jánošík (1921 film), a Slovak film
 Jánošík (1935 film), a Slovak film
 Jánošík I, a Slovak film
 Jánošík II, a Slovak film
 Jánošík (1976 cartoon), a Slovak full-length cartoon
 Lukáš Jánošík (born 1994), a Slovak footballer
 Peter Jánošík (born 1988), a Slovak footballer

See also 
 Janosik (disambiguation)

Slovak-language surnames